MJM may refer to:

 Mbuji Mayi Airport, Democratic Republic of the Congo
 MJM Entertainment Group, an American media production and promotion company 
 MJM International, a company set up by British businesswoman Michelle Mone
 Medebur language of New Guinea (ISO 639-3 code: mjm) 
 MJM Australia, importer and former manufacturer of games
 MJM Music PL, Polish record label